Doppleganger is an action-adventure game designed by David T. Clark for the Amstrad CPC and published by Alligata and Americana in 1985.

Gameplay

Reception

Doppleganger was given mixed reviews, including being rated 51% by Amtix and 63% by Amstrad Action, and given four out of five stars by Home Computing Weekly.

References

1985 video games
Action-adventure games
Amstrad CPC games
Amstrad CPC-only games
Fantasy video games
Single-player video games
Video games developed in the United Kingdom
Video games featuring female protagonists
Video games about witchcraft
Alligata games